Pico Posets or Punta de Llardana is the second highest peak of the Pyrenees, after Aneto.

Ascent route

From the Angel Orús refuge (2,095 m), a well-marked path heads northwest. After an hour of climbing the route crosses a stream. Further on, the path forks. The route follows the right-hand fork along a narrow valley (Canal Fonda), which has a snowy section almost all year round, so it is advisable to take an ice axe and crampons.

In under three hours, the path leads to the foot of the Tooth of Llardana (which can be ascended more easily when returning from the summit of the Posets).
Following the stone slope after four hours of ascent the summit is reached.

The descent to the refuge follows the same route and takes about three hours.

See also
Espadas Peak

References

External links

Rutas y Travesías en los Pirineos : Posets - Cotiella - Benasque

Mountains of the Pyrenees
Mountains of Aragon
Pyrenean three-thousanders